Eupithecia likiangi is a moth in the family Geometridae. It is found in China (Yunnan).

References

Moths described in 1976
likiangi
Moths of Asia